Litoporus dimona is a cellar spider species found in Brazil.

See also 
 List of Pholcidae species

Pholcidae
Spiders of Brazil
Endemic fauna of Brazil
Spiders described in 2000